Donald Graham may refer to:

 Donald Graham (politician) (1848–1944), politician in British Columbia, Canada
 Don Graham (developer) (1914–2010), developer of the Ala Moana Center
 Don Graham (rugby league) (1917–1997), Australian rugby league player
 Don Graham (music promoter) (born 1935), former executive at A&M Records; co-founder of Blue Thumb Records
 Donald E. Graham (born 1945), chairman of the Washington Post Company, 2000–present, publisher of Washington Post
 Donald L. Graham (born 1948), American judge 
 Don Graham (American football) (born 1964), former American football linebacker
 Donald W. Graham (1883–1976), Canadian-American fine artist and art instructor
 Donald William Graham (1917–2010), fighter pilot and United States Air Force general